Chen Fei (Simplified Chinese:), born in 1983, Hong Tong, Shanxi Province, China, was trained at the Beijing Film Academy, and in 2005, was graduated from Fine Arts Department. His passion for and extensive knowledge of movies has influenced his choice of subjects and compositional style in his paintings.

Exhibitions
 2011
 Images of Women IX, Schoeni Art Gallery, Hong Kong
 Art Stage Singapore, Marina Bay Sands, Singapore
 2010
 Bad Taste, Schoeni Art Gallery, Hong Kong (solo)
 2009
 One-Track Minded, Star Gallery, Beijing (solo)
 New Works, Star Gallery, Beijing
 Enliven – In between Realities and Fiction, Animamix Biennale, Today Art Museum, Beijing
 Niubi Newbie Kids II, Schoeni Art Gallery, Hong Kong
 SHContemporary 09, Shanghai Exhibition Centre, Shanghai
 From Zero to Hero, Star Gallery, Beijing
 My 2009 Dream Art Exhibition, Today Art Museum, Beijing
 2008
 Niubi Newbie Kids, Schoeni Art Gallery, Hong Kong
 CIGE 2008 China International Gallery Exposition, China World Trade Centre, Beijing
 Superficiality is not our Motto – Post 80’s Art, Star Gallery, Beijing
 Rebuild – China School Charity’s Artwork Donation Exhibition for the Sichuan Earthquake, Star Gallery, Beijing
 Finding Oneself, Minsheng Art Museum, Shanghai
 The Origin – The First Moon River Sculpture Festival, Moon River Art Museum, Beijing
 2007
 Gathering Sand Castles - Chinese New Generation Artist Award Exhibition, Yan Huang Art Museum, Beijing
 2004
 Chen Fei Solo Oil Painting Exhibition, Beijing Film Academy, Beijing (solo)

References

External links
Chen Fei - THE FRANKS-SUSS COLLECTION
Chen Fei – artnet
Chen Fei's first solo show in Europe opens at Galerie Urs Meile artdaily.com, accessed 2016-05-24

Artists from Shanxi
Beijing Film Academy alumni
People from Linfen
1983 births
Living people